Benjamin Martin (born November 12, 1984) author of young adult/urban fantasy novels. He currently lives in Okinawa.

Bibliography

Samurai Awakening novels
Samurai Awakening (Tuttle Publishing 2012)
Revenge of the Akuma Clan (Tuttle Publishing 2013)
TBA

Jitsugen Samurai Diaries shorts
The Tanner's Daughter (2013)
TBA

Recognition

Samurai Awakening
 2013 Middle East/Asia/India Crystal Kite Awards
 2011 Amazon Breakthrough Novel Award semi-finalist

Photography
Benjamin won the 2012 Tarumi Kengo prize in the Coral Way Photo Contest

References

External links

 Benjamin Martin's Website
 Benjamin Martin's Blog

21st-century American novelists
American fantasy writers
American writers of young adult literature
Living people
1984 births
American male novelists
21st-century American male writers